HD 33283 is a star in the southern constellation Lepus with one planet and a co-moving stellar companion. With an apparent visual magnitude of 8.05, the star is too faint to be seen with the naked eye. It is located at a distance of 294 light years from the Sun based on parallax, and is drifting further away with a radial velocity of +4.5.

This is an ordinary G-type main-sequence star with a stellar classification of G3/5V. It is about 3.6 billion years old and is chromospherically inactive. The star is spinning slowly with a projected rotational velocity of 1 km/s and an estimated rotation period of about 55.5 days. It is larger and more massive than the Sun. HD 33283 is radiating over four times the luminosity of the Sun from its photosphere at an effective temperature of 5,985 K.

Planetary system
In 2006, J. A. Johnson and associates found a jovian planet orbiting HD 33283 with the radial velocity method.

See also
 HD 33564
 HD 86081
 HD 224693
 List of extrasolar planets

References

External links
 



G-type main-sequence stars
M-type main-sequence stars
Planetary systems with one confirmed planet
Double stars

Lepus (constellation)
J05080100-2647509
Durchmusterung objects
033283
023889